Spiritchaser is the seventh studio album by Dead Can Dance, and would prove to be the last before the duo reunited fourteen years later for Anastasis. It expands on its exploration of world music, and like Into the Labyrinth, was recorded at Quivvy Church, Perry's personal studio in Ireland.

The album was dedicated to Lisa Gerrard's deceased brother, Mark Gerrard.

The track "Indus" contains a melody that is very similar to that of "Within You Without You", a Beatles song that George Harrison wrote and recorded with Indian musicians in 1967. Although their use of a similar melody was not deliberate, Perry and Gerrard were asked to contact Harrison for his permission to use it; he granted it, but the record company insisted that they give him partial songwriting credit on "Indus".

Track listing

Release history

Personnel
Personnel adapted from Spiritchaser liner notes.
Dead Can Dance
 Lisa Gerrard – vocals, instrumentation, production
 Brendan Perry – vocals, instrumentation, production

Additional personnel
 Robert Perry – percussion (tracks 1 and 5)
 Lance Hogan – percussion (tracks 1 and 5)
 Peter Ulrich – percussion (tracks 1 and 5)
  Rónán Ó Snodaigh – percussion (tracks 1 and 5)
 Renaud Pion – Turkish clarinet (track 3)
 Klaus Vormehr – engineering (tracks 1 and 5)

Charts

Certifications

References

External links
  at the band's official website
 Spiritchaser lyrics at Genius.com
 

1996 albums
Dead Can Dance albums
4AD albums